Songs from the Road may refer to:

 Songs from the Road (Jeff Healey album), 2009
 Songs from the Road (Joanne Shaw Taylor album), 2012
 Songs from the Road (Leonard Cohen album), 2010
 Songs from the Road, a re-release of the 2009 album and concert DVD Seven Moons Live by Jack Bruce and Robin Trower